Yellow Generation (known as YeLLOW Generation in Japan) was a female J-pop trio signed under Sony Music Japan's DefSTAR Record label from 2002-2006.

The trio was made up of the members Yuki (ユキ), Yūko (ユウコ), and Hitomi (ヒトミ). Altogether the band had released two albums and nine singles, but after a year of silence the band finally decided to part ways on November 15, 2006.

Albums

Carpe Diem - December 11, 2002

01. Open your eyes
02. Carpe Diem～今、この瞬間を生きる～ (Carpe Diem ~ima kono shunkan o ikiru~)
03. 北風と太陽 (Kitakaze to Taiyō)
04. 逃げ水～Like a road mirage～ (Nigemizu ~Like a road mirage~)
05. Lost Generation
06. Another“Myself”
07. 裸の王様 (Hadaka no Osama)
08. 2880316～地球最後の日の皆様へ～ (2880316 ~Chikyū Saigo no Hi no Minasama e~)
09. Christmas Card
10. 鬼灯 (Hozuki)
11. I will never forget.～もうひとつの理由～ (I will never forget)
12. And Just Open Your Heart

Life-Sized Portrait - August 10, 2005

01. Yellow
02. 扉の向こうへ (Tobira no Mukō e)
03. うたかた (Utakata)
04. Listen!
05. トリトマ (Toritoma)
06. レモナーデ (Remona-De)
07. あのね・・・ (ano ne...)
08. チョコレイト～鮮烈な味わい魅惑の世界～ (Chocolate ~senretsu na ajiwai miwaku no sekai~)
09. 夜空に咲く花～eternal place～ (Yozora ni Saku Hana ~eternal place~)
10. 春雷 (Shunrai)
11. 終わりのない道 (Owari no Nai Michi)
12. 扉の向こうへ～Fullmetal mix～ (Tobira no Mukō e ~FULLMETAL mix~)

Singles

Lost Generation - June 5, 2002

01. Lost Generation
02. 逃げ水 ~Like a road mirage~ (Nigemizu ~Like a road mirage~)
03. Lost Generation (less vocal)

北風と太陽 (Kitakaze to Taiyō) - August 21, 2002

01. 北風と太陽 (Kitakaze to Taiyō)
02. 2880316 ~地球最後の日の皆様へ~ (2880316 ~Chikyū Saigo no Hi no Minasama e~)
03. 北風と太陽 (less vocal)

Carpe Diem~今,この瞬間を生きる~ (Carpe Diem ~Ima, kono Shunkan o Ikiru~) - November 20, 2002

01. Carpe Diem~今,この瞬間を生きる~ (Carpe Diem ~Ima, kono Shunkan o Ikiru~)
02. 裸の王様 (Hadaka no Ousama)
03. I will never forget.~もうひとつの理由~(less Music Version) (I will never forget ~Mō hitotsu no Riyū~(less Music Version))
04. Carpe Diem~今,この瞬間を生きる~(less Vocal Version)

うたかた (Utakata) - May 14, 2003

01. うたかた (Utakata)
02. 春雷 (Shunrai)
03. うたかた (less vocal)
04. 春雷 (less vocal)

夜空に咲く花~eternal place~ (Yozora ni Saku Hana ~eternal place~) - September 18, 2003

01. 夜空に咲く花~eternal place~ (Yozora ni Saku Hana ~eternal place~)
02. …by my side
03. 君がいたから~eternal way~(朗読) (Kimi ga Itakara ~eternal way~ (Spoken Version))
04. 夜空に咲く花~eternal place~(less vocal) 扉の向こうへ (Tobira no Mukō e) - January 28, 2004

01. 扉の向こうへ (Tobira no Mukōou e)02. 君がいたから~eternal way~ (Kimi ga Itakara ~eternal way~)03. 扉の向こうへ (less vocal)
04. 君がいたから~eternal way~(less vocal)Yellow - April 6, 2005

01. Yellow
02. Take Out
03. Yellow-less vocal-
04. Take Out-less vocal-トリトマ (Tritoma) - July 13, 2005

01. トリトマ (Tritoma)02. 恋のから騒ぎ!? (Koi no Karasawagi!?)03. トリトマ(less vocal)
04. 恋のから騒ぎ!?(less vocal)Dual'' - December 7, 2005

01. Dual
02. two love, true love
03. Dual (less vocal)
04. two love, true love (less vocal)

References

Defstar Records artists
Japanese girl groups
Musical groups established in 2002
Musical groups disestablished in 2006
Japanese pop music groups